Western Sahara conflict